George Burrow Gregory (29 January 1813 – 5 March 1892) was an English lawyer and Conservative politician.

Life and politics
Gregory was the son of John Swarbreck Gregory, a lawyer who was a member of the first council of the Law Society. He was educated at Eton and at Trinity College, Cambridge. He became a partner in firm of Gregory, Rowcliffe, Rowcliffe, and Rawle, solicitors  and was treasurer of Foundling Hospital from 1857 to 1892.

In 1868 Gregory  was elected Member of Parliament for East Sussex until it was replaced under the Redistribution of Seats Act 1885. He was then elected MP for East Grinstead and held the seat for a year until 1886.

Burrow died at the age of 79.

Burrow married Maria Teresa Price in 1847.

References

External links 
 

1813 births
1893 deaths
People educated at Eton College
Alumni of Trinity College, Cambridge
Conservative Party (UK) MPs for English constituencies
UK MPs 1868–1874
UK MPs 1874–1880
UK MPs 1880–1885
UK MPs 1885–1886